There is a small community of French people in Japan, consisting largely of expatriate professionals from France and their families.

Overview
The French community in Japan has been steadily increasing, rising by more than 35% in the last decade. French expatriates who are working in Japan with leading foreign companies came from many different industries such as chemicals and crystal-ware. As far as inbound tourism from France is concerned, France ranked at 15th place in 2018, with 304,900 French tourists visiting Japan.

There are 4 bilingual schools, 60 cultural associations, and over 700 companies in Japan.

Notable Japanese people of French descent
  - Composer, musician and tarento
 Minami Hinase - Model and actress
 Masayoshi "Mabo" Kabe - Guitarist and a bass player
 Hikari Mitsushima - Actress
 Michel Miyazawa - Football player
 Mitomi Tokoto - A DJ of Cyberjapan
 Anna Ohura - AV (adult video) performer and model
 Maria Ozawa - AV (adult video) performer and model
 Marc Panther - Rapper
 Erika Sawajiri - Actress, model and musician
 Erika Sema - Tennis player
 Yurika Sema - Tennis player
 Christel Takigawa - TV announcer and TV News presenter
  - Actor

See also
 France–Japan relations
 Japanese people in France
 Gaijin

References

European diaspora in Japan
Japan
Japan
 
 
France–Japan relations